Barycz may also refer to:

 Barycz (river), in western Poland
Barycz, part of the Swoszowice district of Kraków
Barycz, Pabianice County in Łódź Voivodeship (central Poland)
Barycz, Radomsko County in Łódź Voivodeship (central Poland)
Barycz, Lower Silesian Voivodeship (south-west Poland)
Barycz, Brzozów County in Subcarpathian Voivodeship (south-east Poland)
Barycz, Przemyśl County in Subcarpathian Voivodeship (south-east Poland)
Barycz, Świętokrzyskie Voivodeship (south-central Poland)